, nicknamed , is a Japanese singer and dancer. She is known as one of the members of the Japanese electropop group Perfume.

Biography
Ōmoto was born and raised in Fukuyama City, Hiroshima Prefecture, and attended Actor's School Hiroshima with friends and Perfume members Ayaka Nishiwaki and Yuka Kashino. She was placed in the advanced class for singing, as she was always interested in singing. In a letter she wrote to her "Future Me" she recalled her singing teacher telling her if she just wanted to sing and dance because she loved it. Nishiwaki and Kashino were still in the beginner class at this time, meeting Ōmoto secretly.

She joined the group in 2001, replacing the original third member Yūka Kawashima, who left the group to focus on her schoolwork.

In 2002, she appeared in an advertisement for Johnson & Johnson.

Ōmoto graduated from Horikoshi High School. In April 2007, she enrolled into J. F. Oberlin University together with fellow Perfume member Yuka Kashino. However, while Kashino graduated in March 2011, Ōmoto dropped out by 2008.

On 18 April 2008 Perfume made a special guest appearance performing "Ceramic Girl" at the ending of drama "Sumire ♡ 16 sai!!".

On 23 March 2012 Perfume made a special guest appearance performing "Baby Cruising Love" in the movie "Moteki".

On 31 March and 1 April 2017, Ōmoto played the character "Noribu" on TV Tokyo Special drama 'Pensées'.

In September 2017, Ōmoto dubbed "the mail delivery person" on "FASTENING DAYS 3" mini-series.

NOCCHi's regular page "NOCCHi wants to play games!” on the Japanese music news site “Ongaku Natalie” was released on January 1, 2020.

Appearance

TV Program  
 "Kandada's Labyrinth " in the back of the multi-tenant building  ( NHK , August 6, 2019 )
 I want to play a game! Matsulie special edition "Nocchi wants to play a sound game! " ( Matsulie , January 30, 2021 12:00 to January 31, 2021 23:59)

Still Model  
 Facial Cleansing Foam "Clean & Clear " ( Johnson & Johnson , 2002 ) --Graphic Advertising Model

Digitally distributed content 

Writing activity

Web serialization 
 "I want to play a game!" (January 1, 2020-serialized, music Natalie , irregular serialization)
Comment Contribution

Book  
 " Sakura Gakuin 10th Anniversary" Thank you ... "" (February 14, 2021 Limited-time production, amuse, special message contribution)

Magazine  
（July 15, 2014, BOOK interview）
（May 27, 2017, comment contribution）

Web  
 Akai Koen 3rd Album "Jyunjo Randoseru " (March 1, 2016, message contribution)

 Queen Bee 5th Full Album "Q " (April 14, 2017, message contribution)

 la la larks 1st Full Album " Culture Vulture" (August 30, 2017, message contribution)

References

External links

 Official Perfume website 
 
 

Amuse Inc. talents
Japanese women pop singers
Japanese female dancers
Perfume (Japanese band) members
1988 births
Living people
Horikoshi High School alumni
People from Fukuyama, Hiroshima
Japanese women in electronic music